is a Japanese silk satin damask. It was the preferred fabric for kimono in the Edo period.

References

External links

Japanese words and phrases
Woven fabrics
Japanese weaving techniques